Darío Jara Saguier (27 January 1930 – 22 January 2023) was a Paraguayan football player and coach who played as a striker. Dario is one of the seven Jara Saguier brothers that played professional football in Paraguay.

Career

As player
Jara Saguier started his career in his hometown club Club Rubio Ñú in 1946 before moving to Cerro Porteño where he spent most of his career and became a key player. He was the 1st division topscorer two years in a row (1949 and 1950), scoring 18 goals on each season. In 1960, after a long career with Cerro Porteño, Saguier went on to play for several Paraguayan clubs such as General Caballero ZC, Rubio Ñú, Luis Alberto de Herrera (Guarambaré) and Olimpia de Itá before retiring in 1965.

At the national team level, Darío Jara Saguier was part of the Paraguay squad that competed in the 1950 FIFA World Cup in Brazil.

As coach
Darío Jara Saguier started his coaching career while playing for Olimpia de Itá, where he had the role of player-manager. Along the years he coached teams like Sportivo Trinidense, Rubio Ñu, Resistencia S.C., Deportivo Recoleta, Pdte. Hayes, Club Cerro Corá, Sportivo Ameliano, Cerro Porteño, Luis Alberto de Herrera de Guarambaré, and Olimpia de Ita.

Honours
Cerro Porteño
 Paraguayan Primera División: 1950, 1954

References

1930 births
2023 deaths
Sportspeople from Asunción
Paraguayan footballers
Association football forwards
Paraguay international footballers
1950 FIFA World Cup players
Cerro Porteño players
club Rubio Ñu footballers
General Caballero Sport Club footballers
Club Olimpia (Itá) players
Paraguayan football managers
cerro Porteño managers
Sportivo Trinidense managers
Sportivo Ameliano managers